was a prominent Japanese master of aikido. He was the son of Morihei Ueshiba, founder of aikido, and became the international leader of aikido after his father's death.

Early life
Ueshiba was born on June 27, 1921, in the city of Ayabe, Kyoto Prefecture, Japan. He was the third son and fourth child of Morihei Ueshiba and Hatsu Ueshiba (née Itokawa). Ueshiba began training under his father around 1937.

Aikido career
In 1942, while he was still studying at Waseda University, Morihei Ueshiba (who was retiring to Iwama) appointed him the head of the Kobukan Dojo in Shinjuku, Tokyo. He saved the dojo from fire bombing several times during the World War II. Ueshiba graduated from Waseda University, Faculty of Economics and Political Science with a degree in economics in 1946. 

Speaking about the period just after World War II, Moriteru Ueshiba said, "there was not yet much activity at the Hombu Dojo. For a time my father [Kisshomaru Ueshiba] was actually in Iwama instead ... starting around 1949, he worked for about seven years at a company called Osaka Shoji. He had no other choice. Even if you have a dojo, you can't make a living if nobody is coming to train, which was largely the case after the war. So, he took a job as an ordinary company employee during the day and taught only in the mornings and evenings."

Beginning in 1948, Ueshiba oversaw the development of the Aikikai Honbu organization (and eventually the tearing down of the Kobukan Dojo in 1967 to construct the Aikikai headquarters). In 1952, Ueshiba became a founding member and appointed head of the Aikido Division of the Kokusai Budoin (International Martial Arts Federation) by Prince Kaya Tsunenori to help spread aikido worldwide. In 1969, Kisshomaru Ueshiba assumed the title of Doshu with the passing of the Founder.

Later life
After Morihei Ueshiba's death in 1969, Kisshomaru Ueshiba took on the mantle of Doshu (hereditary head). In 1986, in recognition of his contributions to the public good through the development and growth of Aikido, Kisshomaru Ueshiba received the Medal of Honor with Blue Ribbon from the Japanese Government. In 1990, In recognition of his distinguished services and contributions to cultural exchange between France and Japan, Ueshiba received a gold medal Sports Merit award from the French government. This is the first time a Japanese citizen has received this medal. In 1995, Ueshiba received the Third Order of the Sacred Treasure Award from the Japanese government. By 1998, Ueshiba's health had declined and this necessitated visits to hospital.

Ueshiba died around 5:30 PM on January 4, 1999, in a Tokyo hospital.  The cause of death was respiratory failure. As his father was the first Doshu, he was the second Doshu, and after his death, his son Moriteru Ueshiba became the third Doshu, following the iemoto system.

Publications
 Kisshomaru Ueshiba, A Life in Aikido: The Biography of Founder Morihei Ueshiba (2008), Kodansha International,  
 Kisshomaru Ueshiba, The Art of Aikido: Principles and Essential Techniques (2004) Kodansha International, 
 Kisshomaru Ueshiba, Best Aikido: The Fundamentals (2002) Kodansha International,  
 Kisshomaru Ueshiba, The Spirit of Aikido (1987), Kodansha International,  
 Kisshomaru Ueshiba, Aikido (1985), Japan Publications Trading,

References

 

1921 births
1999 deaths
Japanese aikidoka
Martial arts writers
People from Kyoto Prefecture
People from Tokyo
Waseda University alumni